The Asian land mammal ages, acronym ALMA, establish a geologic timescale for prehistoric Asian fauna beginning 58.7 Mya during the Paleogene and continuing through to the Miocene (Aquitanian) (23.03 Ma). These periods are referred to as ages, stages, or intervals and were established using geographic place names where fossil materials where obtained.

The basic unit of measure is the first/last boundary statement. This shows that the first appearance event of one taxon is known to predate the last appearance event of another. If two taxa are found in the same fossil quarry or at the same stratigraphic horizon, then their age-range zones overlap.

Ages

Tabenbulakian: Lower boundary 28.4 Ma. Upper boundary 23.03 Ma.
Hsandagolian: Lower boundary 33.9 Ma. Upper boundary 23.03 Ma.
Kekeamuan: Lower boundary 33.9 Ma. Upper boundary 28.4 Ma.
Houldjinian: Lower boundary 37.2 Ma. Upper boundary after 33.9 Ma.
Ergilian: Lower boundary before 37.2 Ma. Upper boundary after 33.9 Ma.
Ulangochuian: Lower boundary before 37.2 Ma. Upper boundary 33.9 Ma.
Sharamurunian: Lower boundary 48.6 Ma. Upper boundary 37.2 Ma.
Irdinmanhan: Lower boundary 48.6 Ma. Upper boundary 37.2 Ma.
Arshantan: Lower boundary 48.6 Ma. Upper boundary 37.2 Ma.
Bumbanian: Lower boundary 55.8 Ma. Upper boundary 48.6 Ma.
Gashatan: Lower boundary 58.7 Ma. Upper boundary 55.8 Ma.

Other continental ages

European land mammal age
North American land mammal age
South American land mammal age

See also
Biochronology

References

Paleo Database

 
Regional geologic time scales
Biochronology
Cenozoic Asia